This is Japanimetal Marathon is a compilation album by Japanese novelty heavy metal band Animetal, released in Asia by Sony Music Entertainment Asia on April 7, 1998. The album consists mainly of Animetal Marathon mixed with select tracks from the band's singles along with those of Animetal Lady. Each track is labeled by the anime/tokusatsu title they come from, not by their original song title.

"Makafushigi Adventure!" (from Dragon Ball) is an exclusive track not found in Animetal's other releases.

Track listing
All tracks are arranged by Animetal.

Personnel
 Eizo Sakamoto - Lead vocals
 Mie - Lead vocals (Animetal Lady)
 She-Ja - Guitar
 Masaki - Bass

with

 Munetaka Higuchi - Drums
 Katsuji - Drums
 Yasuhiro Umezawa - Drums
 Shinki - Drums

Footnotes

References

External links

Animetal albums
1998 compilation albums
Japanese-language compilation albums
Sony Music albums